Ryvita is a rye-based crispbread originally manufactured by the Ryvita Company. The company was founded in Birmingham, England, in 1925 by John Edwin Garratt, and is today a subsidiary of Associated British Foods, which in 2009 merged the Ryvita Company with Jordans to form The Jordans & Ryvita Company Limited. Ryvita holds a royal warrant granted by Queen Elizabeth II.

Ranges

United Kingdom

Crispbread
 Original
 Dark Rye
 Sesame
 Multigrain
 Cracked Black Pepper
 Sweet Onion
 Mediterranean Herb
 Hint of Chilli
 Sunflower Seeds & Oats
 Pumpkin Seeds & Oats
 Fruit Crunch

Thins
 Cheddar and Cracked Black Pepper
 Multi-Seed
 Sundried Tomato & Herb
 Sweet Chilli

Thins Bites
 Sweet Chilli
 Cheddar and Cracked Black Pepper

Minis
 Cream Cheese & Chive
 Sweet Chilli
 Salt & Vinegar

Crackerbread
 Original
 Wholegrain
 Pepper
 Cheese

United States

Crispbread

 Pumpkin Seeds & Oats
 Fruit & seed Crunch
 Rye & Oat Bran
 Sunflower Seeds & Oats
 Multi-Grain
 Sesame Rye
 Dark Rye
 Light Rye

Canada

Crispbread

 Light Rye
 Dark Rye
 Sesame Rye
 Rye & Oat Bran
 Multi-Grain
 Sunflower Seeds & Oats
 Pumpkin Seeds & Oats
 Muesli Crunch

Snackbread

 Regular
 High Fibre
 Whole Wheat

Norway

Crispbread

 Dark Rye
 Sesame
 Multi-Grain
 Sunflower Seeds & Oats
 Pumpkin Seeds & Oats

Sweden

Crispbread

 Pumpkin Seeds & Oats
 Sunflower Seeds & Oats
 Dark Rye
 Sesame
 Multi-Grain

Australia

Crispbread

 Original Rye
 Sesame Rye
 Multi-Grain
 Fruit, Honey & Nuts
 Sunflower Seeds & Oats
 Pumpkin Seeds & Oats

Crackerbread

 Original

New Zealand

Crispbread

 Original Rye
 Sesame Rye
 Multi-Grain

Other countries

 Africa 
Ghana, Kenya, Nigeria, South Africa, Zambia

 Caribbean 
Bahamas, Barbados, Bermuda, St Lucia, Trinidad

 Europe 
Cyprus, Finland, Greece, Iceland, Ireland, Malta, Poland, Portugal, Spain, Tenerife, The Netherlands

 Middle East 
Lebanon, Kuwait, Saudi Arabia, United Arab Emirates

See also
 Ry-Krisp

References

External links
 The official Ryvita website

Brand name crackers
Companies based in Poole
British Royal Warrant holders
Associated British Foods brands
1925 establishments in England
British companies established in 1925
Food and drink companies established in 1925